Toski Smith (9 April 1871 – 28 February 1934) was a South African international rugby union player who played as a forward. 

He made 3 appearances for South Africa against the British Lions in 1891 and 1896.

References

South African rugby union players
South Africa international rugby union players
Alumni of Wynberg Boys' High School
1871 births
1934 deaths
Rugby union forwards
Rugby union players from Cape Town
Griquas (rugby union) players